Ramnagar Jaspur, is a village in Jaspur, Udham Singh Nagar district in the state of Uttarakhand in India.

Demographics 
According to the 2011 Indian Census, the town consists of 3,489 people. The state of Uttarakhand has literacy rate of 87.6 percent which is higher than Nation's average of 74.04 percent.

References

External links 

Tourism in Uttarakhand
Villages in Udham Singh Nagar district